The 1912 United States presidential election in Colorado took place on November 5, 1912, as part of the 1912 United States presidential election. State voters chose six representatives, or electors, to the Electoral College, who voted for president and vice president.

Colorado was won by New Jersey Governor Woodrow Wilson (D–New Jersey), running with governor of Indiana Thomas R. Marshall, with 42.80% of the popular vote, against the 26th president of the United States Theodore Roosevelt (P–New York), running with governor of California Hiram Johnson, with 27.09% of the popular vote, the 27th president of the United States William Howard Taft (R–Ohio), running with Columbia University President Nicholas Murray Butler, with 21.88% of the popular vote and the five-time candidate of the Socialist Party of America for President of the United States Eugene V. Debs (S–Indiana), running with the first Socialist mayor of a major city in the United States Emil Seidel, with 6.15% of the popular vote.

Results

Results by county

Notes

References

Colorado
1912
1912 Colorado elections